Since the first printing of Carl Linnaeus's Species Plantarum in 1753, plants have been assigned one epithet or name for their species and one name for their genus, a grouping of related species. These scientific names have been catalogued in a variety of works, including Stearn's Dictionary of Plant Names for Gardeners. William Stearn (1911–2001) was one of the pre-eminent British botanists of the 20th century: a Librarian of the Royal Horticultural Society, a president of the Linnean Society and the original drafter of the International Code of Nomenclature for Cultivated Plants.

The first column below lists seed-bearing species epithets from Stearn's Dictionary, Latin for Gardeners by Lorraine Harrison, The A to Z of Plant Names by Allen Coombes, The Gardener's Botanical by Ross Bayton, and the glossary of Stearn's Botanical Latin. Epithets from proper nouns, proper adjectives, and two or more nouns are excluded, along with epithets used only in species names that are no longer widely accepted. Classical and modern meanings are provided in the third column, along with citations to Charlton T. Lewis's An Elementary Latin Dictionary. 

Key
LG = language: (L)atin or (G)reek
L =  derived from Latin, or both Classical Latin and Greek (unless otherwise noted)
G = derived from Greek
H = listed by Harrison, and (except as noted) by Bayton
D = listed in Stearn's Dictionary
S = listed in Stearn's Botanical Latin
DS = listed in Stearn's Dictionary, with the word or root word listed in Botanical Latin
C = listed by Coombes

Epithets

See also

 Glossary of botanical terms
 List of Greek and Latin roots in English
 List of Latin and Greek words commonly used in systematic names
 List of plant genus names with etymologies: A–C, D–K, L–P, Q–Z
 List of plant genera named for people: A–C,  D–J,  K–P, Q–Z
 List of plant family names with etymologies

Notes

Citations

References
 
 
 
 
 
  Available online at the Perseus Digital Library.

 See http://www.plantsoftheworldonline.org/terms-and-conditions for license.

Further reading 

 
  Reprint of the 1888/1889 edition. Available online at the Perseus Digital Library.

Systematic
Plant species epithets,A
 Systematic
Systematic
Plant species epithets,A
Descriptive plant species epithets,A
Plant species epithets,A
Epithets,A
Wikipedia glossaries using tables